"Do You Mind" is a single by American musician DJ Khaled featuring Nicki Minaj, Chris Brown, Jeremih, Future, August Alsina, and Rick Ross. It was released on July 28, 2016 by We the Best Music Group and Epic Records as the fourth single of the former's ninth studio album, Major Key.  The song peaked at number 27 on the US Billboard Hot 100 and number nine on the US Hot R&B/Hip-Hop Songs charts. It was eventually certified triple platinum by the Recording Industry Association of America (RIAA).

Composition
The song samples "Lovers and Friends" performed by Lil Jon & the East Side Boyz, featuring Usher and Ludacris, which also samples "Lovers and Friends" performed by Michael Sterling from his 1990 album Trouble and also interpolates "Money Ain't a Thang" performed by Jermaine Dupri featuring Jay Z in Future's verse.

Chart performance
The single debuted at number 49 on the US Hot R&B/Hip-Hop Songs chart on the week of August 20, 2016. The following week, it debuted at number 94 on the US Billboard Hot 100 chart on the week of August 27, 2016. Eventually, the single reached its peak at number 27 on the Hot 100 and number nine on the Hot R&B Hip-Hop Songs charts. On August 24, 2021, the single was certified triple platinum by the Recording Industry Association of America (RIAA) for combined sales and streaming units of over three million units in the United States.

Music video
The song's music video, directed by Gil Green premiered after the 2016 BET Hip Hop Awards on October 4, 2016. It features video model Bernice Burgos as Khaled's love interest. As of November 2020, the video has over 318 million views.

Synopsis
The video begins as the camera pans down on Khaled's clothes in his mansion. His love interest (Burgos) is throwing his clothes and phone on the floor while confronting him about being home at 6:00 in the morning. The next scene shows Khaled playing the song on a grand piano while a lady seduces him. The scene cuts to Minaj where she is in an apartment sitting on a couch while twerking on an armchair. The next scene involve Brown and Alsina singing the chorus next to Khaled in a platform above a pool. After that, it shows Brown being seduced by a lady above the piano. As Alsina sings his verse, he is shown caressing his woman in the bedroom. Jeremih sings his verse next as he flirts with his woman against the wall while dancing for him. After the second chorus, Future is rapping while a few women are drinking a bottle, sporting Beats by Dre headphones and Galaxy cigarette lighters. Rick Ross raps his verse against a series of stained glass windows with his woman standing beside him. Towards the end of the video, Khaled talks to Burgos that when she doesn't stress her, he can maneuver the "jungle" while comparing his love to a king and queen revealing his new name to be "Billy". He then gives her a new necklace telling her she's "a major key to me." The video fades out as they embrace.

Track listing

Charts

Weekly charts

Year-end charts

Certifications

Release history

References

2016 singles
2016 songs
DJ Khaled songs
Nicki Minaj songs
Chris Brown songs
Jeremih songs
Future (rapper) songs
August Alsina songs
Rick Ross songs
Songs written by DJ Khaled
Songs written by Nicki Minaj
Songs written by Chris Brown
Songs written by Jeremih
Songs written by Future (rapper)
Songs written by Rick Ross
Song recordings produced by DJ Khaled